Zabičiūnai is a village in the Zarasai District Municipality, Lithuania. According to the 2021 Lithuanian census, 37 people lived in Zabičiūnai. In the centre of the village there is a cemetery covered with maples, yews and olive bushes. A few gravestones have survived, with the oldest one having 1884 engraved on it. The last burial happened in July 1944, the name of the person was Kostas Morozov and he died by shrapnel from an exploding shell.

Population

References 

Zarasai District Municipality
Villages in Utena County